WMCU may refer to:

 WQOS (AM), a radio station (1080 AM) licensed to serve Coral Gables, Florida, United States, which held the call sign WMCU from 2007 to 2010
 WMLV, a radio station (89.7 FM) licensed to serve Miami, Florida, United States, which held the call sign WMCU from 1970 to 2007